Walldorf (South Franconian: Walldoaf) is a town in the Rhein-Neckar-Kreis district in the state of Baden-Württemberg in Germany.

In the eighteenth century, Walldorf was the birthplace of John Jacob Astor, who emigrated and became a prominent fur trader in the newly independent United States, establishing a monopoly in North America. Concentrating on real estate acquisition and investment, and based in New York City, he grew even wealthier and was the patriarch of the wealthy and influential Astor family.

Walldorf is home to the world's third largest software company SAP.

Geography
The neighbouring town to the southeast is Wiesloch. The towns are strongly linked economically. Adjacent municipalities are Sandhausen, Leimen, Nußloch, St. Leon-Rot and Reilingen. The train station, named Wiesloch-Walldorf, is located between the two towns.

History
Hallstatt-culture barrows are preserved in the Hochholz woods, near the offices of SAP Deutschland. The earliest documentary mention of the settlement occurs as Waltorf in a 770 deed issued by the Abbey of Lorsch. The Electorate of the Palatinate received Walldorf as an Imperial fief in 1230. The town suffered much during the Thirty Years' War of 1618–1648, and in 1689 was completely destroyed in the course of the French invasion during Nine Years' War. The area was settled anew by religious refugees, among them the predecessors of John Jacob Astor, Waldensians from Piedmont.

During the German Mediatisation, Walldorf fell to Baden. In 1843 the Rheintalbahn was built: this railway decisively promoted economic development. In 1901 Grand Duke Frederick I of Baden granted Walldorf town privileges. After World War II the companies Heidelberger Druckmaschinen (founded 1850) and SAP (founded 1972; moved to Walldorf in 1977) were established in Walldorf.

Politics

Seats in the municipal assembly (Gemeinderat) as of 2019 elections:

 CDU (Christian Democratic Union): 6 (29,03%)
 SPD (Social Democratic Party of Germany): 6 (24,80%)
 Grüne (Alliance '90/The Greens): 5 (24,24%)
 FDP (Free Democratic Party): 5 (21,93%)

Economy

SAP SE has its headquarters in the city since 1977. It is Europe's most valuable brand, as well as the largest non-American software enterprise by revenue.

Twin cities 
  Astoria, Oregon, United States, since 1963
  Kırklareli, Turkey, since 1970
  Saint-Max, France, since 1985
  Waldorf, Maryland, United States, since 2002
  Freeport, New York, United States, since 2003

Sights
The Astorhaus was built in 1854, from a pecuniary legacy of the deceased John Jacob Astor to his hometown. For decades, it served as an almshouse, and now hosts the register office and a museum.

The 19th-century synagogue was devastated in the 1938 Kristallnacht attacks and most of the congregation was killed in the Holocaust. The building is now used as a New Apostolic Church.

Walldorf is known for cultivating white asparagus, which is available in the months of April through June.

Representation in other media
British writer John Le Carré refers to the town, without naming it, in his novel Absolute Friends (2003), which is primarily set in Heidelberg.

Notable people

 Joseph Anton Sambuga (1752-1815), a German Catholic theologian of Italian descent.
 John Jacob Astor (1763–1848), entrepreneur, emigrated as a young man to the United States, where he made a fortune in fur trading and real estate acquisition; he was the wealthiest man in the nation at his death.
 Leopold Rügheimer (1850–1917) a notable German chemist, invented the Staedel-Rugheimer pyrazine synthesis
 Dietmar Hopp (born 1940), billionaire software entrepreneur
 Timo Jouko Herrmann (born 1978) a German composer, musicologist and conductor.

References

External links 

Official Homepage

Rhein-Neckar-Kreis
Baden